Kanjikoil is a panchayat town in Erode district in the Indian state of Tamil Nadu. The ancient name of the town is "Kanji Kooval" and it is called by the Name Kanji koil or Kanji Kovil.

Demographics
 India census, Kanjikoil had a population of 11,148. Males constitute 50.2% of the population and females 48.8%. Kanjikoil has an average literacy rate of 59%, lower than the national average of 59.5%: male literacy is 66%, and female literacy is 53%. In Kanjikoil, 7% of the population is under 6 years of age.

Economy

The Main income sources of the town are Agriculture and weaving.

The surroundings of the town has many farm lands and the water source being supplied by Lower Bhavani Canal project. The main agricultural products includes Rice, Sugar cane, Turmeric, and coconut.

The town has many Handloom and powerloom weaving centers and hence the half of the income of the town contributes with weaving.

Culture
Kanji kovil has a major temple Sree Seedeviamman. This temples celebrates the festival every year in the month on June / July as Car festival for 5 days. This includes Fire stepping, Ratham Ula. During this festival many cultural programs conducted in the town by local political and social welfare parties.

The other festival celebrated is Periya Mariamman temple festival and festival will be celebrated in  End of December or 1st week of January .

Transportation 

Kanji kovil has well connected with the District capital Erode by means of Town busses run by government and private sectors. It also connected with nearby towns Chithode, Nasiyanur, Perundurai and Kavindapadi by buses.

It has connected with the following Road facilities.

 SH 175 - Connecting Erode and Thingalur run thro' the town
 Panchayat Union roads connecting Perundurai, Kavindapadi, Ellispet and Chitthode.

Nearest airport is Coimbatore is about 85 km from the town and the nearest railway station is Erode Junction is about 15 km from the town.

Education

Kanjikoil has the Union Primary school, Govt Higher secondary school, Kongu vellalar matriculation school and mahidhar academy school situated on the central western part of the town.

See also
Perumapalayam

References

Cities and towns in Erode district